The Nordic Race Walking Championships is an annual racewalking competition between athletes from the Nordic countries organised by Nordic Athletics. Established in 1957, it was a biennial competition until 2004. The events vary between road competitions and track competitions each edition. The 1975 and 1979 editions were open to non-Nordic athletes.

The championships features two senior races: a men's 20 kilometres race walk and a women's 10 kilometres race walk. There are also six further age category competitions: 20 km walk for under-23 men, 10 km walk for under-23 women and under-20 men, and 5 kilometres race walk for under-20 women and both sexes under-18. A men's 50 kilometres race walk event was held at the championships until 2010. The age category events were held as the Nordic Junior Race Walking Match from 1966 to 2003, before being folded into the main championships.

Editions
The 1959 course was short.

Medalists

Men's 20 km walk

References

Editions
Competition Venues. Nordic Athletics. Retrieved 2019-08-13.

Nordic Athletics competitions
Recurring sporting events established in 1957
1957 establishments in Sweden
Under-20 athletics competitions
Racewalking competitions